The Hospital Rock Tunnels are a small pair of highway tunnels passing through a ridge on the edge of the Ko‘olau Range on the island of O‘ahu, Hawaiʻi, USA. The tunnels are "cut and cover" tunnels.

Also nearby are the larger Tetsuo Harano Tunnels.

References

Road tunnels in Hawaii
Transportation in Honolulu County, Hawaii
Buildings and structures in Honolulu County, Hawaii